Hoogmeien is a hamlet in the Dutch province of Gelderland. It is a part of the municipality of Buren, and lies about 8 km northeast of Tiel.

It was first mentioned around 1400 as "Homeden en Nedermeden", and means high hay land. It is not a statistical entity, and the postal authorities have placed it under Lienden. It consists of about 25 houses.

References

Populated places in Gelderland
Buren